The 1932–33 season was Stoke City's 33rd season in the Football League and the 13th in the Second Division.

After almost gaining promotion last season there was great belief that Stoke would finally make a return to the First Division. And they would do so in impressive style, setting a number of records as they finished in 1st place, a point ahead of Tottenham Hotspur to claim the Second Division title.

Season review

League
After last season's success the main topic amongst the supporters was whether or not their squad of up-and-coming young players was good enough to get Stoke promoted. Mather did not sign anyone during the summer claiming he was happy with his squad and confident that promotion could be gained.

Stoke started the 1932–33 season brilliantly winning 13 from their first 18 matches, with Joe Johnson, Joe Mawson, Bobby Liddle and Stanley Matthews in fine form. No wins in December allowed Tottenham Hotspur to close the gap at the top of the table and they would be destined to be running partners for the rest of the season. Mawson suffered injury towards the end of the season which would ruin his career and Mather brought in Reading forward Jack Palethorpe to fill the gap and he did well scoring eight goals in ten matches.

Stoke produced the goods and with a 5–2 win over Lincoln City they finished top of the table taking the Second Division title in style finishing a point above Tottenham Hotspur and six ahead of third-placed Fulham. Stoke achieved a number of records during a memorable season, such as most wins in the Football League (25), the best goal average in the top two leagues (2.000), the best away record in Division Two, and the best defensive record. Joe Mawson became leading goalscorer for the second season running with 16 goals. During the season Bob McGrory was made coach of the reserve squad and only made a few appearances.

FA Cup
With Stoke's main goal achieving promotion little pressure was placed on the FA Cup and ultimately they tamely lost 4–1 at Middlesbrough.

Final league table

Results
Stoke's score comes first

Legend

Football League Second Division

FA Cup

Squad statistics

References

Stoke City F.C. seasons
Stoke